Toni Louise Hodgkinson (born 12 December 1971) is a former New Zealand middle distance runner, originally from Tākaka. She currently holds the New Zealand woman's record in the 800 m.

As a student at Golden Bay High School, Hodgkinson set many New Zealand track and field age-best times, several of which still stand, including 1500 m in 4:29:50 at 13 and 2:04.31 at 17.

She is 180 cm tall and in her competing days, weighed 62 kg.

She represented New Zealand at both the Olympics and the Commonwealth Games. At the 1996 Summer Olympics she made the final, placing eighth with a time of 2:00:54. At the 2000 Summer Olympics she competed in both the 800 m and 1500 m, making it through to the semi finals in the 800m with a time of 1:59:84.

Hodgkinson competed at the 1990 Commonwealth Games as an 18-year-old, and again at the 1998 Commonwealth Games where she finished eighth in the 1500m final. In 1997, Hodgkinson was a finalist for the Halberg New Zealand Sportswoman of the Year, an honor bestowed upon New Zealand's greatest athletes.

After a decade of living in Auckland, Hodgkinson now lives in Motueka with her husband Alistair Smart and their children. In 2009, Hodgkinson competed for the Motueka Marvels in the TVNZ game show series Top Town. The Motueka Marvels made it into the finals as the Wild Card team and lost to Taupo in the semi-final.

Personal bests
Outdoor:
 

Indoor:

References

Living people
1971 births
New Zealand female middle-distance runners
Athletes (track and field) at the 1996 Summer Olympics
Athletes (track and field) at the 2000 Summer Olympics
Athletes (track and field) at the 1990 Commonwealth Games
Athletes (track and field) at the 1998 Commonwealth Games
People from Tākaka
Olympic athletes of New Zealand
Commonwealth Games competitors for New Zealand